Tim Rawle is an English architectural photographer and writer. He is best known for his photographs of buildings in Cambridge, England.

Biography
Tim Rawle was born in Ashford, Kent. After studying fine art and graphic design at St Martin's School of Art and at the Central School of Art and Design, London, he read architecture at Downing College, Cambridge, continuing his education at the Architectural Association, where he was Caldicott Scholar.

He first came to attention with the publication of his book Cambridge Architecture in 1985. Besides providing the text and the photographs for this venture he also designed the book. The Daily Telegraph described it as "an astonishingly comprehensive book . . . a unique and valuable record". A revised edition was brought out by André Deutsch in 1993.

In 1987 he provided the photography and design for Cinzia Maria Sicca's Committed to Classicism: The Building of Downing College, Cambridge. The following year he was commissioned to design a new pictorial book on the National Portrait Gallery's collection as well as a small guide to the NPG's outstation at Bodelwyddan Castle, North Wales.

In 1991, he set up a small business called "The Cambridge Portfolio" to publish calendars, diaries, greetings cards and postcards featuring his photographs of Cambridge buildings and Cambridge town and gown. He did the photography and design for the official guide to King's College Chapel. For a period spanning several years he produced prospectuses for many Cambridge colleges and independent schools in south-east England.

In 2005 he published the book Cambridge (Frances Lincoln). In his review in CAM, the university magazine, Peter Richards wrote: "At the heart of the book lies a fascinating exploration of seven hundred years of University architecture . . . This is, quite simply, the best introduction to Cambridge ever published."

The Howard Foundation commissioned Rawle to be the author and photographer of a new book on Downing College published in 2015 and described by the Georgian as a "well-researched architectural history" with "exceptional photographs".

Rawle was appointed a Fellow Commoner of Downing College, Cambridge in 1987.

Bibliography
 Cambridge Architecture (1st ed., sponsored by Cambridge Consultants) London: Trefoil Books, 1985. 224 pp. ; paperback   
 Committed to Classicism: The Building of Downing College, Cambridge. With Cinzia Maria Sicca (main author), Edward Powell, Charles Harpum (contrib.) Cambridge: Downing College, Cambridge, 1987. 228 pp. ; paperback  
 Cambridge Architecture (2nd ed.) London: André Deutsch, 1993. 240 pp.  
 Cambridge (1st ed.). London: Frances Lincoln, 2005. 192 pp.   
 Classic Cambridge: 100 Photographs by Tim Rawle. Cambridge: The Cambridge Portfolio, 2012. 128 pp.  
 The Chapel of Trinity College, Oxford. With Martin Kemp (author). London: Scala Arts & Heritage Publishers, 2014. 88 pp.  
 A Classical Adventure: The Architectural History of Downing College, Cambridge. Tim Rawle (author), Tim Rawle and Louis Sinclair (photographers), John Adamson (editor). Cambridge: Oxbridge Portfolio, 2015, 200 pp.  
 Cambridge. Tim Rawle (author and photographer), John Adamson (editor) (new edition with a foreword by William Bortrick). Cambridge: Oxbridge Portfolio, 2016, 204 pp.

References

External links
 Tim Rawle's official site
 The Cambridge Portfolio site
 The Oxbridge Portfolio site

Alumni of the Central School of Art and Design
Alumni of Downing College, Cambridge
Alumni of Saint Martin's School of Art
Architectural photographers
Living people
Year of birth missing (living people)